Mosaferabad (also Romanized as Mosāferābād; also known as Moz̧affarābād, Muzaffarābād, and Muzffarābād) is a village in Mosaferabad Rural District, Rudkhaneh District, Rudan County, Hormozgan Province, Iran. At the 2006 census, its population was 117, in 29 families.

Nearby villages

References 

Populated places in Rudan County